are a Japanese jazz fusion band.

Lead Musicians

These 3 are the Core of Ottottrio.
 Issei Noro of Casiopea (guitar)
 Masahiro Andoh of T-Square (guitar)
 Hirokuni Korekata of KORENOS (guitar)

Ottottrio Band

 Chizuko Yoshihiro (keyboards, Full-Time 1988, Part-Time 1998)
A freelance keyboardist, Chizuko Yoshihiro played with Ottottrio Live in 1988, but only played on 3 tracks of their 1998. He Album, Triptych. Her son Ronnie is an upcoming great skateboarder and he will soon turn pro. 
 Shotoku Sasaji (keyboards, 1988)
Only performed with Ottottrio in 1988.
 Chiharu Mikuzuki (bass guitar, 1988)
Only performed with Ottottrio in 1988, but went on to work with Various other Japanese Jazz-Fusion Musicians (including Former T-Square Keyboardist Tadashi Namba).
 Hiroyuki Noritake (drums, 1988 and 1998)
T-Square's Drummer, who performed with Ottottrio in 1988 (alongside Masahiro Andoh, who plays Guitar for the same group), and played on Triptych.
 Keiji Matsumoto (Keyboards, 1998)
Matsumoto played on only 1 track of Triptych. A year later, he became T-Square's Keyboardist.
 Ko Shimizu (Bass, 1998)
 One of the Founding Members of Naniwa Express, Ko Shimizu played 3 tracks on Triptych.
 Masanori Shimada (keyboards, 1998)
 Played 3 tracks on Triptych.
 Shinichi Kusama (keyboards, 1998)
Played only 1 track on Triptych.
 Tetsuo Sakurai
Casiopea's Bassist from 1979 to 1990, played 3 tracks on Triptych.
 Mitsuru Sutoh
T-Square's Bassist from 1987 to 2004, played 3 tracks on Triptych.

Discography

Super Guitar Session: Hot Live
Published by Polydor Records in July 1988.
 "Boys be Ambitious" (Issei Noro) – 4:54
 "Guitar Cubic" (Hirokuni Korekata) – 5:08
 "Pricia" (Korekata) – 7:53
 "Mr. Moon" (Masahiro Andoh) – 5:16
 "Ue o muite arukō (Sukiyaki)" (中村八大) – 3:53
 "We're All Alone" (Boz Scaggs) – 7:41

Super Guitar Session: Red Live
Published by Sony Records in July 1988.
 "Conga" (Enrique Garcia) – 4:32
 "Eyes of the Dragon" (Masahiro Andoh) – 7:08
 "Special Happening" (Issei Noro) – 5:07
 "Saving All My Love for You" (Michael Masser, Gerry Goffin) – 4:25
 "Triple Fighting" (Hirokuni Korekata) – 7:22
 "Land of a Thousand Dances" (Chris Kenner, Fats Domino) – 5:37

Triptych
Published by Village Records on December 12, 1998.
"Desert Dog" (Masahiro Andoh)
"Sea Dragon" (Hirokuni Korekata)
"Watch It" (Issei Noro)
"You've Got a Friend" (Carole King)
"And I Love Her" (John Lennon, Paul McCartney)
"Sunny" (Bobby Hebb)
"Soft Madness" (Andoh)
"Coral in Blue" (Korekata)
"Flash Out" (Noro)

External links 
 
 OTTOTTRIO - last.fm

References

Japanese jazz ensembles
Jazz fusion ensembles